The safe handling of carcinogens is the handling of cancer causing substances in a safe and responsible manner. Carcinogens are defined as 'a substance or agent that can cause cells to become cancerous by altering their genetic structure so that they multiply continuously and become malignant'. The Australian NOHSC Definitions divides carcinogens into three categories. Category 1 carcinogens are substances known to be carcinogenic to humans. Category 2 carcinogens are substances that should be regarded as if they were carcinogenic to humans. Category 3 carcinogens are defined as substances that have possible carcinogenic effects in humans but about which there is insufficient information to make an assessment. Substances are most often categorised as category 1 carcinogens by epidemiological data and as category 2 or 3 carcinogens through the results of animal testing. Mixtures containing more than 0.1% of a category 1 or 2 carcinogen or more than 1% of a category 3 carcinogen must also be considered carcinogenic and be appropriately labelled.  
Many carcinogens are used in industry and everyday life, making the safe handling of carcinogens an important consideration.

Routes of exposure 
The main routes of exposure to carcinogens come from direct contact through the methods of inhalation, contact, injection, absorption or ingestion. Each of these exposure routes and severity of damage can vary depending on the potential carcinogen in question. As many carcinogens have a chronic effect and symptoms may only appear after repeated long term exposure, making symptoms and exposure hard to monitor.

Methods to control exposure 
Section 9.2 of the Australian National Code of Practice for the Control of
Scheduled Carcinogenic Substances, [NOHSC:2014( It also protects the skin against any harsh chemicals......carcinogenic substances is not prohibited, exposure to these substances shall be prevented or, where that is not practicable, adequately controlled so that risks to health are minimised."  
There are many standard operating procedures (SOP) to the ensure the safe handling of carcinogens in both industry and domestic use. These include:

Elimination 
Ideally carcinogenic substances should be avoided by substitution with less hazardous substances. Alternate form of carcinogenic substances may also be used to minimise the risk of exposure. In the case of carcinogens which pose a danger through inhalation, pastes or pellets can be used to avoid the possibility of airborne dust. Volatile liquids can also potentially be substituted with paste forms to avoid excessive formation of vapours.

Equipment design 
Standard containment devices such as fume hoods, glove boxes, use of high efficiency particulate air (HEPA) filters, ventilated containment or weighing, or placing the carcinogenic substance in a sealed weighed container (Tare Method). The employment of these methods and equipment can help reduce the unnecessary exposure to the carcinogens. Special care must be taken when using single exposure carcinogens such as polycyclic aromatic hydrocarbons. All surfaces where carcinogens are used must be of a suitable material, e.g.: stainless steel, plastic trays or absorbent plastic backed paper. Correct signs must be placed outside of the work stating 'No eating, drinking or smoking' and 'Danger carcinogen in use. Authorised personnel only'.

Accident procedures 
A quick response to an accident or spill can greatly reduce exposure to a carcinogenic substance. If a spill or accident occurs ensure that the contaminated materials are disposed of in the correct hazardous waste bin(ensure stained clothing is removed immediately), a correct spill kit is used on the spill, in the case of a liquid spill, ensure that the spill is cleaned as soon as possible to prevent the formation of aerosols, have employees tested for exposure to carcinogens, refer to MSDS for specific treatment or dangers. Prepare spill kits and emergency plans prior to beginning use of the carcinogenic substances and in the case of a large spill vacate the area and call for assistance.

Personal protective equipment 
The correct personal protective equipment must be worn when handling carcinogens. Ensure safety goggles, impermeable gloves (of an appropriate material), respirator (if appropriate), face shield, impermeable apron, closed toed shoes, long sleeved lab coat are worn. Disposable aprons and lab coats are preferable to reduce risks of repeated exposure.

Storage 
The correct storage of carcinogens is important in reducing exposure. Limit access to carcinogens, keep containers and amounts used as small as possible, double containers and chemical resistant trays. Store in a designated area with the appropriate hazard signs and ventilation if required. The carcinogens should be stored in a separate area to flammable solids and corrosive liquids as to avoid any damage to containers and possible leaking of carcinogenic compounds. By Australian law, carcinogens must also be properly labelled when stored. Category 1 or 2 carcinogens or mixtures containing above 0.1% of such substances must be labelled either with the risk phrase "R49 May cause cancer by inhalation", if the risk of carcinogenic effects is only present when the substance's dust or vapours are inhaled. Otherwise, the risk phrase "R45 May cause cancer" is used. Category 3 carcinogens or mixtures containing above 1% of a category 3 carcinogens must be labelled with the risk phrase "R40 Possible risks of irreversible effects".

Decontamination 
After use of a carcinogen or if exposure to a carcinogen has occurred, ensure the correct decontamination procedure is executed.
Personnel must wash hands and arms with soap and water, immediately after handling. If exposure occurs, contact emergency health services and use safety shower/eye wash station.
Decontamination of area procedures vary depending on the material being handled. Toxicity of some materials can be neutralised with other agents (refer to the MSDS for appropriate action). All surfaces should be wiped down with an appropriate cleaning agent. All waste materials and contaminated PPE must be disposed of in hazardous waste bins.
All equipment used must be decontaminated before removing them from the designated area.

References 

Hazardous materials